Dağyeli is a village in the Güçlükonak District of Şırnak Province in Turkey. The settlement is populated by Kurds of the Jilyan tribe and had a population of 112 in 2021.

The two hamlets of Çelik and Gümüşyaka are attached to Dağyeli.

References 

Villages in Güçlükonak District
Kurdish settlements in Şırnak Province